The 1955/1956 News of the World Snooker Tournament was a professional snooker tournament sponsored by the News of the World. The tournament was won by Joe Davis who won 4 of his 5 matches. He finished ahead of Fred Davis who had also won 4 matches but Joe won more frames overall. The News of the World Snooker Tournament ran from 1949/50 to 1959.

Format
The 1955/56 event was a round-robin snooker tournament and was played from 31 October 1955 to 18 February 1956. Matches were played at various locations around the United Kingdom and also on Jersey. There were 6 competitors and a total of 15 matches. The competitors were Joe Davis, Fred Davis, Walter Donaldson, John Pulman, Jackie Rea and Rex Williams. Each match lasted three days and was the best of 37 frames.

Each match was separately handicapped. Joe Davis played level with Fred Davis and gave John Pulman, Walter Donaldson and Jackie Rea 14 points and Rex Williams 16. Fred Davis gave John Pulman 10, Walter Donaldson and Jackie Rea 12 and Rex Williams 16. John Pulman played level with Walter Donaldson and gave Jackie Rea 7 and Rex Williams 10. Walter Donaldson gave Jackie Rea 7 and Rex Williams 12, Jackie Rea gave Rex Williams 10 points.

Results

Table

The positions were determined firstly by the number of matches won (MW) and, in the event of a tie, the number of frames won (FW).

References

News of the World Snooker Tournament
News of the World Tournament
News of the World Tournament
News of the World Tournament
News of the World Tournament
News of the World Tournament